Juan Ribalta (1597 – October 1628) was a Spanish painter of the Baroque period. He was born and died in Valencia. His father, Francisco Ribalta, was a famous painter, active in the style of Caravaggio.  Some sources said he was born in Madrid and later moved to Valencia.  His mother Inés Pelayo died in 1601. Juan's works and style are similar to that of his father.  He later painted Saint Sebastian at the Valencia Cathedral in 1616, later the small Adoration of the Shepherds (now at the Museo de Bellas Artes de Bilbao) and St. Peter, he also painted portraits including the poet Gaspar de Aguilar.

Works
St. Sebastian (1616), Valencia Cathedral
The Adoration of the Shepherds, Museo de Bellas Artes de Bilbao
St. Peter (around 1625), oil on panel, 167 x 123 cm, Museo de Pellas Artes de Valencia.
St. John
Portrait of the poet Gaspar de Aguilar, oil on panel 65 x 49 cm, Museo de Bellas Artes de Valencia
St. Jerome, oil on panel, Museum of Arts of Catalonia, Barcelona

References

Benito Domenech, Fernando, Los Ribalta y la pintura valenciana de su tiempo (The Ribaltas and Valencian Painting of the Time), Valencia-Madrid, 1987, 
Benito Domenech, Fernando y Vallés Borrás, Vicent Joan, "Un proceso a Francisco Ribalta en 1618", in Boletín de la Academia de Bellas Artes de San Fernando, no. 69 (1989), p. 143-168.
Kowal, David M., Ribalta y los ribaltescos: La evolución del estilo barroco en Valencia (Ribalta and the Ribalt-esque, The Evolution of Baroque Style in Valencia), Valencia, Diputación Provincial, 1985, 

Palomino, Antonio, An account of the lives and works of the most eminent Spanish painters, sculptors and architects, 1724, first English translation, 1739, p. 148
Palomino, Antonio (1988). El museo pictórico y escala óptica III. El parnaso español pintoresco laureado. Madrid, Aguilar S.A. de Ediciones. .
Pérez Sánchez, Alfonso E. (1992). Baroque Paintings in Spain (1600-1750). Cátedra, Madrid. .

External links

Juan Ribalta at the Museo del Prado online encyclopedia which includes his catalog 

1597 births
1628 deaths
Painters from the Valencian Community
17th-century Spanish painters
Spanish male painters
Caravaggisti